Elin Vilhelmiina Airamo (née Fagerholm; 25 May 1886 – 16 December 1971) was a Finnish office worker and politician. She was born in Helsinki. She was a member of the Parliament of Finland, representing the Socialist Workers' Party of Finland (SSTP) from 1922 to 1923. When the SSTP was outlawed in 1923, she was imprisoned on sedition charges until 1926.

References

1886 births
1971 deaths
Politicians from Helsinki
People from Uusimaa Province (Grand Duchy of Finland)
Socialist Workers Party of Finland politicians
Members of the Parliament of Finland (1922–24)
Women members of the Parliament of Finland
Prisoners and detainees of Finland